Trichopalpina is a genus of moths of the family Erebidae. The genus was erected by George Hampson in 1926.

Species
Trichopalpina nimba Fletcher & Viette, 1955 Guinea
Trichopalpina simplex Berio, 1956 Cameroon, Zaire
Trichopalpina zethesia Hampson, 1926 Nigeria, Cameroon, Gambia, Zaire, Malawi, Zimbabwe

References

Calpinae